Jimmy Poulos (born March 14, 1952) is a former American football running back who played one season with the Winnipeg Blue Bombers of the Canadian Football League. He was drafted by the St. Louis Cardinals in the thirteenth round of the 1974 NFL Draft. He played college football at the University of Georgia. Poulos was also a member of the Jacksonville Express of the World Football League.

References

External links
Just Sports Stats
College stats

Living people
1952 births
Players of American football from Georgia (U.S. state)
American football running backs
Canadian football running backs
American players of Canadian football
Georgia Bulldogs football players
Winnipeg Blue Bombers players
Jacksonville Express players
People from Decatur, Georgia